Tuur Dens (born 26 June 2000) is a Belgian racing cyclist, who currently rides for UCI ProTeam . He won the silver medal in the scratch event at the 2021 UCI Track Cycling World Championships.

Major results
2017
 National Junior Championships
1st  Kilo
1st  Scratch race
2018
 1st  Kilo, National Championships
2019
 1st  Keirin, National Championships
2020
 3rd  Scratch race, UEC European Under-23 Championships
2021
 1st  Madison (with Kenny De Ketele), UCI Nations Cup, Cali
 2nd  Scratch race, UCI World Championships
 2nd  Scratch race, UEC European Under-23 Championships

References

External links

2000 births
Living people
Belgian male cyclists
Belgian track cyclists
People from Rotselaar
Cyclists at the 2019 European Games
European Games competitors for Belgium
Cyclists from Flemish Brabant